The Bremen Infantry Regiment, was a Swedish Army infantry regiment organised in Germany in the early 18th century.

History 
The regiment has its origins in Bidals kretsbataljon organised in 1682. That battalion then became was reformed as a regiment in either 1690 or 1703, and was made up of 1,128 men enlisted in Stade in Germany. In 1707 255 men were transferred to Pommerska infanteriregementet. Bremiska infanteriregementet was disbanded when Stralsund capitulated in 1715.

Campaigns 
The Great Northern War (1700–1721)

Organisation 
?

Name, designation and garrison

See also 
List of Swedish regiments
Provinces of Sweden

References 
Print

Online

Infantry regiments of the Swedish Army
Disbanded units and formations of Sweden
Military units and formations established in 1690
Military units and formations established in 1703
Military units and formations disestablished in 1715